Dharmodaya was a monthly magazine in Nepal Bhasa on Theravada Buddhism. It was launched from Kalimpong, India, in 1947 to counter the ban on publication in Nepal.  

Dharmodaya was published by Dharmodaya Sabha, an organization formed in Sarnath by Buddhist monks who had been expelled from Nepal in 1944 for promoting Buddhism and writing in Nepal Bhasa.  

The monthly was published on behalf of Dharmodaya Sabha by Maniharsha Jyoti Kansakar, a Nepalese trader and main benefactor to the monks in exile. The first editors were monks Aniruddha Mahathera and Mahanam Kobid. The magazine had a major effect on standardizing the language. 

In 1959 Dharmodaya ceased publication.

See also
 Buddha Dharma wa Nepal Bhasa (magazine)
 Nepal Bhasa journalism
 Banishment of Buddhist monks from Nepal

References

1947 establishments in India
1959 disestablishments in India
Buddhist magazines
Defunct magazines published in India
Monthly magazines published in India
Magazines established in 1947
Magazines disestablished in 1959
Magazines published in Nepal
Newar-language mass media
1947 establishments in Nepal